Wendy W. Jacob (born 1958) is a multidisciplinary artist. She is best known for works in the areas of sculpture, public art and urban intervention.

Life
Jacob was born in Rochester, New York in 1958. She received her bachelor's degree from Williams College in 1980, and her Master of Fine Arts degree from the Art Institute of Chicago.
Jacob has been a faculty member at the Massachusetts Institute of Technology and
Illinois State University, and taught at Massachusetts College of Art and Design.  
She lives and works in Cambridge, Massachusetts.

Art career
She has created installations and interventions in social spaces since 1989, and has developed a distinct body of sculptural works which investigate the interface between architecture and the bodies of the people and animals who inhabit the built environment. Jacob is also a member of the Chicago-based collaborative Haha, whose work focuses on the exploration of social positions relative to a particular site, and which has produced over two dozen influential projects since the late 1980s.

One of Jacob's collaborations has been the creation of the Squeeze Chair, inspired by Temple Grandin's hug machine. For several years in the 1990s, Jacob has worked with Grandin in developing furniture that squeezes or 'hugs' users.

Exhibitions
Jacob has had solo exhibitions at 
 the Kemper Museum of Contemporary Art (Kansas City), 
 the Madison Art Center (Madison, Wisconsin, 1999), 
 the Cleveland Center for Contemporary Art (1998), 
 MIT List Visual Arts Center,
 the Cranbrook Art Museum (Bloomfield Hills, Michigan, 1998), and 
 the Krannert Art Museum (Champaign, Illinois) 1997)

Collections
Jacob's work resides in the collections of Centre Georges-Pompidou, Paris, France; Fonds Regional d'Art Contemporain (fr), Poitou-Charentre, Poitier, France; Fonds Regional d'Art Contemporain, Languedoc-Roussillon, Montpellier, France; Museum of Contemporary Art, San Diego, California; and the MacArthur Foundation, Chicago, Illinois.

Awards
She received the Creative Capital Visual Arts Award in the year 2000. In 2011 she received the Maud Morgan Prize from the Boston Museum of Fine Art.
In the year 2014-15 she was a Fulbright Scholar at the Glasgow School of Art.

Notes and references

External links
 

1958 births
Living people
20th-century American sculptors
Williams College alumni
School of the Art Institute of Chicago alumni
21st-century American sculptors